KLDG is a radio station airing a country music format licensed to Liberal, Kansas, broadcasting on 102.7 MHz FM.  The station is owned by Seward County Broadcasting Co., Inc.

References

External links

Country radio stations in the United States
LDG
Liberal, Kansas